The Joshua Lowe House is a historic home located at Rising Sun, Cecil County, Maryland, United States. It is a two-story, center passage plan brick building three bays wide by two bays deep, built about 1830 in the late Federal. The house is one of the earliest and most substantial buildings in the crossroads village of Rock Springs and served as the first post office for the community from 1830 to 1838.

The Joshua Lowe House was listed on the National Register of Historic Places in 2001.

References

External links
, including photo from 2000, Maryland Historical Trust

Houses on the National Register of Historic Places in Maryland
Houses in Cecil County, Maryland
Houses completed in 1830
Federal architecture in Maryland
1830 establishments in Maryland
National Register of Historic Places in Cecil County, Maryland